Cecil Henry Fox, C.B. (27 May 1873 – 2 Apr 1963) was an Officer in the Royal Navy.

He was born 27 May 1873 in Dublin, Ireland, and joined the Royal Navy 15 January 1886. He was promoted to the rank of Captain on 31 December 1911.

He later commanded , which on 5 August 1914 sank the German minelayer , the first German naval loss of the war. Amphion was sunk shortly afterwards after striking one of Königin Luises mines. Fox transferred to command , and on 17 October 1914 took part in the defeat of four German torpedo boats at the Battle off Texel. He was also involved in the Raid on Cuxhaven on Christmas Day, 1914.

He was subject of one of the 240 Cinderella Stamps issued for the Lord Roberts Memorial Fund.

Fox died at this home in Sherborne, Dorset on 2 April 1963, aged 89. He was buried on 6 April 1963.

References 

1873 births
1963 deaths
Royal Navy officers
Military personnel from Dublin (city)
Companions of the Order of the Bath